Francisco Delgado López (1514 – 2 October 1576) was a Roman Catholic prelate who served as Bishop of Jaén (1566–1576) and Bishop of Lugo (1561–1566).

Biography
Francisco Delgado López was born in Villapun in 1514. On 13 June 1561, he was appointed during the papacy of Pope Pius IV as Bishop of Lugo. On 11 January 1562, he was consecrated bishop by Diego Ramírez Sedeño de Fuenleal, Bishop of Pamplona, with Luis Suárez, Bishop of Dragonara, and Rodrigo Vázquez, Titular Bishop of Troas, serving as co-consecrators. On 26 April 1566, he was appointed during the papacy of Pope Pius V as Bishop of Jaén. He served as Bishop of Jaén until his death on 2 October 1576.

References

External links and additional sources
 (for Chronology of Bishops) 
 (for Chronology of Bishops) 
 (for Chronology of Bishops) 
 (for Chronology of Bishops) 

15th-century Roman Catholic bishops in Castile
16th-century Roman Catholic bishops in Spain
Bishops appointed by Pope Pius IV
Bishops appointed by Pope Pius V
1514 births
1576 deaths